Precious Friend is a record by Arlo Guthrie and Pete Seeger with Shenandoah (produced by John Pilla) and a Warner Bros. recording.

Precious Friend was  recorded in 1981 at the Poplar Creek Music Theater, Pine Knob Music Theatre (DTE Energy Music Theatre), Greek Theatre and Concord Pavilion. It is a compilation of songs from when Guthrie and Seeger toured together. Some of its most famous songs are: "Kisses Sweeter than Wine", made famous by The Weavers, "If I Had a Hammer", and a multi- religious "Old Time Religion".

Arlo also has a few "songs" that are more just him telling stories and thinking out loud. Pete has one too. The song Sailin' Up, Sailin' Down is based on his Hudson River Sloop Clearwater to clean up the Hudson River in the 1960s and beyond. They also perform three of Woody Guthrie's songs.

Track listing
Side One

"Wabash Cannonball" (public domain)
"All My Life's a Circle" (Harry Chapin)
"Hills of Glenshee" (public domain)
"Ocean Crossing" (Guthrie)
"Celery-Time" (Guthrie)
"Run, Come See Jeruselum" (Blind Blake)
"Sailin' Up Sailin' Down" (Jimmy Reed)

Side Two

"How Can I Keep from Singing" (Doris Plenn)
"Old Time Religion" (public domain)
"Pretty Boy Floyd" (Woody Guthrie)
"Ladies Auxiliary" (Woody Guthrie)
"Please Don't Talk About Me When I'm Gone" (Sam H. Stept, Sidney Clare)
"Precious Friend, You Will Be There" (Pete Seeger)

Side Three

"Do Re Mi" (Woody Guthrie)
"Tarentella" (public domain)
"The Neutron Bomb Story" (Guthrie) 
"I'm Changing My Name to Chrysler" (Tom Paxton)
"St Louis Tickle" (Guthrie)
"Wimoweh (Mbube)" (Solomon Linda, Paul Campbell)
"Will the Circle Be Unbroken" (Traditional)

Side Four

"Garden Song" (David Mallett)
"Kisses Sweeter than Wine" (Joel Newman, Paul Campbell)
"Raggedy Raggedy" (Lee Hays)
"In Dead Earnest" (Lee Hays)
"If I Had a Hammer" (Pete Seeger, Lee Hays)
"Amazing Grace" (John Newton)

Arlo Guthrie live albums
1981 live albums
Warner Records live albums
Albums recorded at the Greek Theatre (Los Angeles)
Pete Seeger live albums